Jean-Pierre Boccardo (16 March 1942 – 29 January 2019) was a French sprinter, born in Espéraza, who competed in the 1964 Summer Olympics and in the 1968 Summer Olympics.

Biography 
30 selections in Team France A
4 selections in Team de France Jeunes
He improved three times the record of France relay 4 × 400 meters, bringing it to 3 min 5 s 7 in 1966.
He is semifinalist of the Olympic 400m in Tokyo in 46 "" 3, is eighth in the relay 4 × 400 meters at the Olympic Games in 1964 and 1968.
He won the 4x400m relay at the 1963 Mediterranean Games and finished third in the individual 400m.

References

1942 births
2019 deaths
Sportspeople from Aude
French male sprinters
Olympic athletes of France
Athletes (track and field) at the 1964 Summer Olympics
Athletes (track and field) at the 1968 Summer Olympics
Athletes (track and field) at the 1963 Mediterranean Games
Mediterranean Games gold medalists for France
Mediterranean Games medalists in athletics